Rico Chiapparelli is an American former amateur wrestler and mixed martial arts trainer. Being from Baltimore, Maryland, Chiapparelli became known as the "Baltimore Butcher," he was Junior National Champion as a senior in high school, and then was a standout wrestler for the University of Iowa. While at Iowa, he was an NCAA National Champion in 1987 at 177 lbs. After college, he competed in freestyle wrestling in the men's senior level, and went on to become the USAW National Champion in 1989 at 180.5 lbs.

He would make himself famous in MMA by founding the team Real American Wrestling. Currently, Chiapparelli is a mixed martial arts, submission wrestling, and wrestling instructor.

Mixed martial arts career
Having trained Brazilian jiu-jitsu under Renzo Gracie, Chiapparelli got into MMA when he was asked by his friend and wrestling colleague Tom Erikson to corner him in his debut for the 1996's MARS tournament. Though his participation on the event cost him his relationship with Gracie, after learning of the business and the value of wrestling in the sport, Chiapparelli formed the team RAW or Real American Wrestling. It was soon joined by Erikson, Dan Henderson, Randy Couture, Frank Trigg and Vladimir Matyushenko, among others.

Chiapparelli had his first and only MMA match on September 13, 2003, beating Luiz Pantera in the Jungle Fight promotion in Brazil.

Mixed martial arts record

|-
| Win
| align=center| 1-0
| Luiz Pantera
| Decision (unanimous)
| Jungle Fight 1
| 
| align=center| 3
| align=center| 5:00
| Manaus, Amazonas, Brazil
| 
|-

References 

American male sport wrestlers
Iowa Hawkeyes wrestlers
University of Iowa alumni
Living people
Year of birth missing (living people)